During the 17th century in Sweden, the highest officials in the realm were divided into two sections of 5 positions each, they were the Great Officers of The Realm and the Lesser Officers of the Realm. The Lesser Officers of the Realm were directly connected to the Royal Court or one of the branches of the Army.

List of the Lesser Officers of the Realm
The Officers were, in order of precedence:
Marshal of the Realm (Swedish: Riksmarskalk), the senior court official of the Realm
Master of the Horse (Swedish: Riksstallmästare), Superintendent of the King's Stables, Stud Farms and of the Cavalry
Master of the Artillery (Swedish: Riksfälttygmästare), Chief of the Field Artillery Corps
Master of the Hunt (Swedish: Riksjägmästaren), superintendent of the King's Forests
Quartermaster general (Swedish: Generalkvartermästare), In charge of army supplies and fortifications.

See also 
 History of Sweden
 Privy Council of the Swedish monarch

Sweden
Sweden
Political history of Sweden
17th century in Sweden

de:Reichsrat (Schweden)
fi:Valtaneuvosto
sv:Riksrådet i Sverige